Paratrophon dumasi is a species of sea snail, a marine gastropod mollusk in the family Muricidae, the murex snails or rock snails.

Description

Distribution
This marine species occurs in Antarctic waters off the Islands Saint Paul & Amsterdam

References

 Velain, C., 1877. Description des mollusques. Archives de Zoologie Expérimentale et Générale 6: 98-144
 Fischer-Piette, E. & Beigbeder, J., 1943. Catalogue des types de gastéropodes marins conservés au laboratoire de Malacologie. II. - Tritonalia ; Thyphis ; Trophon. Bulletin du Muséum national d'Histoire naturelle 2° série, 15(5): 324-328

External links
 Vélain C. (1877). Observations générales sur la faune des deux iles [Saint-Paul et Amsterdam suivies d´une description des mollusques. Archives de Zoologie Expérimentale et Générale. 6: 1-144, pls 1-5]

Muricidae
Gastropods described in 1877